Margarita Kolosov (born 11 March 2004 in Potsdam, Germany) is a German rhythmic gymnast.

Kolosov has been training at the federal base in Fellbach with Yuliya Raskina since 2016.

Personal life 
Together with her sister, Margarita Kolosov started training rhythmic gymnastics at SC Potsdam in 2010, at the age of 6. Her main ambition is to compete at the Olympics, like her idol Margarita Mamun, in Paris 2024. In 2020, Margarita, together with numerous athletes, appeared in the music video by Tim Bendzko for the song "HOCH" (OLYMPIA TEAM D VERSION).

Career

Junior 
Together with her sister, Margarita Kolosov began rhythmic gymnastics at SC Potsdam. In August 2016, she moved to the federal base in Fellbach. From 2017 to 2019, she was German Junior Champion in the all-around. While she won only one final in 2017, she also won all four gold medals in the following two years. In 2018 she started together with Emeli Erbes at the European Championships in Guadalajara . Since the German senior group retired shortly before the competition, they could not participate in the team classification. At the first Junior World Championships in Rhythmic Gymnastics in Moscow in 2019, she placed 15th in the team event with Darja Varfolomeev.

Senior 
In 2020 due to the COVID-19 pandemic, Kolosov was only able to take part in a few competitions in her first senior season. In 2021 she competed for the first time at the German Championships in the senior category, as part of "The Finals" and won all the gold medals in the individual competitions. At her first European Senior Championships in Varna, she qualified for the all-round final, finishing 24th. She also reached the all-around final at the World Championships in Kitakyūshū and finished 16th, the best result of a German individual gymnastics since 2013. At the end of the year, she and the team of the Berlin TSC finished second in the rhythmic gymnastics bundesliga.

She started the 2022 season competing at World Cup Athens where she won bronze with ball and silver with ribbon. At the World Cup in Sofia she finished 11th in the all-around and 8th in the ball final. In Tashkent she was 4th in the all-around behind her teammate Darja Varfolomeev as well as in the hoop final, she won Germany's first World Cup gold medal in the ball final also earning silver with clubs, she was 5th in the ribbon final. In Pamplona she ended 9th in the all-around, qualifying only for the ball final where she ended in 8th and hoop where she won gold instead. In June she competed along  Helena Ripken in Pesaro, being 7th in the All-Around and 4th in the ball final. Margarita then competed at the European Championships in Tel Aviv, along Varfolomeev, the senior group and the two juniors Lada Pusch and Anna-Maria Shatokhin, she was 15th in the All-Around, 7th with hoop, 5th with ball, 29th with ribbon. At the World Cup in Cluj-Napoca she was 18th in the All-Around and didn't qualify for finals. Kolosov was also selected for the World Championships in Sofia along Varfolomeev and the senior group, there she silver the team category.

In 2023 she showed her clubs routine in the italian clubs championship's first stage, where she competed for Pontevecchio Bologna. In March she won silver in the All-Around at the Fellnach-Schmiden Tournament quaifying for all four apparatus finals, here she also won silver with ribbon and ball.

Achievements 

 First German rhythmic gymnast to win a gold medal in an individual apparatus final at the FIG World Cup series.

Routine music information

Competitive highlights
(Team competitions in seniors are held only at the World Championships, Europeans and other Continental Games.)

References

External links 
 

2004 births
Living people
German rhythmic gymnasts
People from Potsdam
21st-century German women
Medalists at the Rhythmic Gymnastics World Championships